Virginia's 2003 state elections were held on November 4, 2003.  Voters elected all 100 members of the Virginia House of Delegates to two-year terms ending in 2006, and all 40 members of the Virginia Senate to four-year terms ending in 2008. There were also elections for local offices (such as Board of Supervisors, Sheriff and Clerk of the Circuit Court) in most counties.

This was the first set of Senate elections since the General Assembly redrew districts as a result of population shifts captured in the decennial federal census.  As a result, there were a few members of the House who retired.

Other than the minor effects of redistricting, there was no unifying theme advanced by either party.  Governor Mark Warner did not announce his new fiscal plans for the biennium until after the election, to avoid affecting the General Assembly results.  According to the University of Virginia's Center for Politics, the election was "about nothing, almost entirely local affairs and personality-driven, with no mandate generated and no meaning beyond the total of seats gained and lost."

State Senate
Previous to the election, Virginia's Senate consisted of 23 Republicans and 17 Democrats. Republicans picked up one open seat, that of retiring Senator Leslie Byrne, who found her district leaning too far to the right to make a serious effort.  This resulted in Republican control of the Senate by a 24 to 16 majority, a post-Civil War low for the Democratic Party.

Election Results
Party abbreviations: D - Democratic, R - Republican, I - Independent, IG - Independent Green, L - Libertarian

Note: Only Senate districts that were contested by more than one candidate are included here.

House of Delegates

Previous to the election, Republicans controlled the House of Delegates with 64 seats, compared to the Democrats' 34 seats, and two seats held by Republican-leaning Independents.  Democrats won four seats from the Republicans, defeating one incumbent and taking three open seats, while one Republican took an open seat previously held by a Democrat, making the post-election composition of the House 61 Republicans, 37 Democrats, and 2 Independents.

References

External links
 Virginia State Board of Elections -- Election Results

 
Virginia